Lisa Paulsen is a former president and CEO of the Entertainment Industry Foundation, in the United States. She held the position for 27 years.

References

American nonprofit chief executives
Living people
American women chief executives
Year of birth missing (living people)
21st-century American women